State Route 261 (SR 261) is a state highway that forms part of the Eastern Transportation Corridor toll road system in Orange County, California. It runs from Walnut Avenue and Jamboree Road in Irvine north to SR 241. North of this interchange, SR 241 becomes part of the Eastern Transportation Corridor. SR 261 parallels Jamboree Road for its entire length. SR 261 does not directly connect with I-5 in Irvine, as Jamboree Road and other streets must be used to make the connection.

Route description
The southern end of SR 261 is in Irvine, splitting from Jamboree Road near Walnut Avenue, while Jamboree continues south as a locally-maintained divided highway to Barranca Parkway. SR 261 then runs north parallel to Jamboree Road towards Santiago Canyon Road (CR S18) in the city of Orange near Irvine Lake. While Jamboree Road has an interchange with I-5, SR 261 does not and instead passes underneath the interstate without any connecting ramps. The toll road then continues next to The Market Place, an outdoor shopping center straddling the border of Irvine and Tustin, before going through a toll plaza after the Irvine Boulevard interchange. Following this is the Portola Parkway exit, after which SR 261 passes through hilly, wilderness terrain alongside the Irvine Village of Orchard Hills to the east and the border with Tustin to the west. After the final exit with Santiago Canyon Road in Orange, SR 261 merges with SR 241, which continues north towards SR 91.

SR 261 is part of the California Freeway and Expressway System, and is part of the National Highway System, a network of highways that are considered essential to the country's economy, defense, and mobility by the Federal Highway Administration.

History
The California State Legislature added SR 231 to the state highway system in 1988; it was a route from I-5 around the Tustin–Irvine boundary to SR 91. In 1991, the Legislature renumbered part of SR 231 to be SR 261. Five years later, SR 231 was renumbered to SR 241, and the southern terminus with I-5 was changed to become Walnut Avenue.

Tolls
SR 261 employs a barrier toll system, where drivers are charged flat-rate tolls based on what particular toll booths they pass through. Since May 13, 2014, the road has been using an all-electronic, open road tolling system. And on October 2, 2019, the license plate tolling program, under the brand name "ExpressAccount", was discontinued. Drivers may still pay using the FasTrak electronic toll collection system or via a one time payment online. Drivers must pay within 5 days after their trip on the toll road or they will be assessed a toll violation.

There is one mainline toll gantry at Irvine Ranch. , the gantry uses a congestion pricing scheme based on the time of day for FasTrak users, while non-FasTrak drivers must pay the $3.32 maximum toll regardless of the day and time. Tolls are also collected at a flat rate at selected on-and off-ramps: Irvine Blvd's northbound onramp ($2.69), northbound offramp ($2.12), and southbound onramp ($2.12); and Portola Parkway ($2.69, free on the northbound offramp).

Exit list

See also

References

External links

 – includes toll information on SR 261 and the other Toll Roads of Orange County
California Highways: Route 261
California @ AARoads.com - State Route 261
Caltrans: Route 261 highway conditions

261
State Route 261
261
261
Irvine, California
Transportation in Orange, California